The 1992 Currie Cup Rural B was the fifth division of the Currie Cup competition, the premier domestic rugby union competition in South Africa. This was the 54th season since the competition started in 1889. The competition was known as the Currie Cup Rural D in 1991.

Teams

Changes between 1991 and 1992 seasons
Currie Cup Rural D was reduced to three teams for 1992.
 The Currie Cup Rural D was renamed Currie Cup Rural B for 1992.

Competition

There were three participating teams in the 1992 Currie Cup Rural B competition. These teams played each other twice over the course of the season, once at home and once away. Teams received two points for a win and one points for a draw.

In addition, all the Currie Cup Rural B teams also played in the 1992 Currie Cup Rural A & B.

Log

Fixtures and results

Round one

Round two

Round three

Round four

Round five

Round six

See also
 1992 Currie Cup
 1992 Currie Cup / Central Series
 1992 Currie Cup Central A
 1992 Currie Cup Central B
 1992 Currie Cup Central / Rural Series
 1992 Currie Cup Rural A & B
 1992 Lion Cup

References

Rural B